Scorpiodoras heckelii is a species of thorny catfish from the Negro, Orinoco and upper Amazon basins in Brazil and Venezuela.  This species grows to a length of  SL.

References

Doradidae
Fish of South America
Fish of the Amazon basin
Fish of Brazil
Fish of Venezuela
Taxa named by Rudolf Kner
Fish described in 1855